Miss Supranational Vietnam ( Vietnamese: Hoa hậu Siêu quốc gia Việt Nam ) is a beauty pageant in the Vietnam was first held in 2018 to look for Vietnamese representatives at the Miss Supranational competition.

The current Miss Supranational Vietnam is Nguyễn Huỳnh Kim Duyên from Cần Thơ. She was appointed as Miss Supranational Vietnam 2022 at the launch press conference of Miss Universe Vietnam 2022 on February 22, 2022.

Titleholders

Vietnam's representatives at Miss Supranational
Color keys

See also
 Miss Vietnam
 Miss Universe Vietnam
 Miss World Vietnam
 Miss Earth Vietnam
 Miss Grand Vietnam
 Miss Vietnamese World
 Mister Vietnam
 Vietnam at major beauty pageants

References

Beauty pageants in Vietnam
Vietnam